Washim Assembly constituency is one of the 288 constituencies of the Maharashtra Vidhan Sabha and one of the three which are located in the Washim district. It is reserved for Scheduled Caste candidates.

It is a part of the Yavatmal-Washim (Lok Sabha constituency) with the adjoining Yavatmal district along with five other Vidhan Sabha assembly constituencies, viz. Karanja, Ralegaon (ST), Yavatmal(ST), Digras and Pusad.

As per orders of Delimitation of Parliamentary and Assembly constituencies Order, 2008, No. 34 Washim Assembly constituency is composed of the following: 1. Mangrulpir Tehsil, 2. Washim Tehsil of the district.

Members of Legislative assembly

See also
Washim

Notes

Assembly constituencies of Maharashtra